Robert Henry Bahmer (September 27, 1904 – March 14, 1990) served as Fourth Archivist of the United States from November 7, 1965 to March 9, 1968.

Life and career
Bahmer was born near Gardena, North Dakota. He earned his bachelor's degree from Valley City State University in Valley City, North Dakota, his master's from the University of Colorado at Boulder, and a doctorate from the University of Minnesota, Twin Cities.

Bahmer joined the National Archives in 1936. During World War II, he served as chief of archival services for the United States Navy. Bahmer became deputy archivist in 1948, was named acting archivist in 1965, and became the official archivist on January 16, 1966, serving until his retirement two years later. He served as president in the Society of American Archivists between 1961-1962.

In 1970, Bahmer was given North Dakota's Rough Rider Award. 

He died in Las Vegas, Nevada, on March 14, 1990.

References

External links
Robert H. Bahmer - Class of 1928
National Archives and Records Administration
Archivists of the United States, 1934 - Present
Theodore Roosevelt Rough Rider Award Biography for Robert H. Bahmer

1904 births
1990 deaths
University of Minnesota alumni
American archivists
National Archives and Records Administration
Presidents of the Society of American Archivists
Lyndon B. Johnson administration personnel